Supercar is a British children's television series produced by Gerry Anderson and Arthur Provis' AP Films (APF) for ATV and ITC Entertainment. Thirty-nine episodes were produced between 1961 and 1962, and it was Anderson's first half-hour series. In the UK it was seen on ITV, in Canada on the CBC, and in the US in syndication (the first Anderson series to be shown overseas) debuting in January 1962. The series uses Supermarionation, based on the complex and difficult Czech style of marionette puppetry. The creation of the series was credited to Gerry Anderson and Reg Hill, but it incorporates elements of Beaker's Bureau, a series proposed to the BBC by Hugh Woodhouse that was never produced. Anderson would later claim that the whole point of having a series based on a vehicle was to minimize having to show the marionettes walking, an action which he felt never looked convincing.

The star of the series was Supercar, a multi-environment craft invented by Professor Rudolph Popkiss and Doctor Horatio Beaker, and piloted by Mike Mercury. Airbreathing jet engines and retractable wings in the rear allowed it to fly like a vertical-takeoff-and-landing airplane; retrorockets on the side slowed it. On land it rode on a cushion of air rather than wheels. Non-airbreathing rocket engines allowed it to travel underwater like a submarine and fly in outer space. The vehicle's navigation system contained "Clear-Vu" to allow the pilot to see through fog and smoke. The vehicle was housed in and supported from a laboratory at Black Rock, Nevada, U.S.A.

In the first episode, "Rescue", the Supercar's mission is to save passengers of a downed private plane. Two of the rescued, young Jimmy Gibson and his pet monkey Mitch, are invited to live at the facility and share in subsequent adventures.

The series inaugurated what became an Anderson trademark: the launch sequence. With the exception of The Secret Service, all of his series until Terrahawks included these – in Supercars case, the charging and firing of port and starboard engines, the activation of an interlock, the opening of (overhead) hangar doors, and finally the vertical take-off.

Episodes

Series history and production
After Granada Television declined to order a second series of Four Feather Falls, its creator Gerry Anderson approached Lew Grade of ATV with the idea for Supercar. Anderson proposed a budget of £3,000 per episode, which Grade demanded be cut in half. After working through the night, Anderson returned the next morning with the budget reduced by only a third. However, Grade still commissioned the series.

Scriptwriter brothers Hugh and Martin Woodhouse devised supporting characters Dr Beaker, Masterspy and Zarin to expand on Anderson's original concept, which featured only Mike Mercury, Jimmy and Mitch. Before partnering with Anderson, the Woodhouses had been developing their own series about the Beaker character under the working title Beaker's Bureau. The brothers wrote at the rate of one complete "shooting (camera-ready) script" per week; this was done to fit Anderson's (and Grade's) cost, and production schedule.

Anderson always claimed that he invented a futuristic vehicle as an excuse to reduce the amount of walking the marionette puppets had to do, which could never be made to look realistic. This was taken to its conclusion in Captain Scarlet, in which the marionette puppets are almost never seen walking.

There were several working models of Supercar, which was designed by art director Reg Hill. The larger, hero model was made of lightweight wood and Perspex (Plexiglas), and measured about seven feet (2 m) in length. It was built by Laurie Barr of Aeronautical and General Modelmakers Ltd (now Mastermodels). A mid sized model (around 1 m in length), sculpted by Slough craftsman Bill James, and another smaller model (approximately 0.5 m) were used for the titles. One of the smaller models, used in distance shots, was about nine inches (23 cm) in length and was also sculpted by Bill James. Fans such as Austin Tate have speculated that Hill was inspired by the style of vehicles such as the 1954 Ford FX-Atmos concept car. In 1959, Ford displayed an actual flying car, the Ford Levacar Mach I.

Principal photography on the first 26 episodes began in September 1960 and ran for about 12 months, with the production filming one episode every two weeks. As filming progressed, Gerry Anderson married dialogue director and voice actress Sylvia Thamm. After a brief midday ceremony, the couple returned to the studio to help complete the opening title sequence.

This marked APF's first use of rear projection effects. Background footage for driving scenes was filmed on the M1 motorway. To film Supercar shooting out of the sea, the crew set up a garden swimming pool and yanked the submerged miniature model out of the water on a fishing line. Sets featuring vegetation used cuttings from real trees for greater realism.

Filming on the series' second production block, comprising its final 13 episodes, began in October 1961. Regarded as "Series 2" of Supercar, the final 13 episodes were the first APF productions to be credited as being "Filmed in Supermarionation".

The music for the series was composed and conducted by Barry Gray. The opening and closing theme song vocalist for the first series was Mike Sammes; for the second series, Sammes' vocal group The Mike Sammes Singers re-recorded the theme.

The complete series is available on DVD in the United Kingdom, Australia, and North America, where it has been issued twice. The series was released on Blu-ray in the 60th Anniversary year on 20 September 2021.

Cast and characters

Cast of characters

Recurring heroes
 Mike Mercury: test pilot of Supercar; voiced by Graydon Gould
 Professor Rudolph Popkiss: co-inventor of Supercar; voiced by George Murcell in series 1 and Cyril Shaps in series 2
 Doctor Horatio Beaker: co-inventor of Supercar; voiced by David Graham.
 Jimmy Gibson: kid brother of Mike's pilot friend Bill Gibson, saved by Mike in episode 1; voiced by Sylvia Anderson, credited as Sylvia Thamm in series 1
 Mitch: Jimmy's pet monkey; voiced by David Graham.

Recurring villains
 Masterspy: a foreign spy, obsessed with stealing Supercar; voiced by George Murcell in series 1 and Cyril Shaps in series 2
 Zarrin: Masterspy's henchman; voiced by David Graham.  
 Mr. Harper: a posh English criminal; voiced by George Murcell.
 Ben Judd: a lower-class Cockney criminal; voiced by David Graham.

Other recurring characters
 Bill Gibson: Jimmy's elder brother, Mike Mercury's pilot friend who owns a shipping business; voiced by David Graham
 Felicity Beaker: Doctor Beaker's cousin, who owns an estate in Africa; voiced by Sylvia Anderson

Casting the characters
The cast for Supercar was put together weeks before shooting was to commence. The lines were recorded in the rushes theatre, which was transformed into a recording studio. Lines were recorded on a Sunday (once every month), because the studio was on a trading estate, meaning Sundays were the quietest days of the week. The recording sessions typically took place between 9:30 a.m. and 5:30 p.m., during which time the cast, along with the sound engineers, would try to get through at least three scripts.

Canadian actor Graydon Gould (The Forest Rangers), who voiced Mike Mercury despite never auditioning for the part, was offered it whilst doing a stage production that was shown on television. In an interview Gould recalls that, without owning a car, getting to Slough was difficult because "Sunday transport is about half of what it normally is" but because he had a wife, a two-year-old child and a three-bedroom apartment, he was grateful for the money. Sylvia Anderson directed the sessions and helped Gould with his accent; he recalls, "she would point out when my Canadian accent was slipping through".

David Graham voiced three characters for the series: Doctor Beaker, Zarin, and Mitch the Monkey. He also voiced the recurring character of Bill Gibson. He had previously worked on the series Four Feather Falls where he had shown his ability to provide a variety of different voices. Graham had based his voice for Dr. Beaker on veteran actor Felix Aylmer, while he also spent a day at London Zoo watching monkeys at the Monkey House, trying get a good interpretation as to how Mitch should sound.

George Murcell voiced Professor Popkiss and Masterspy for the first series. He had previously worked for AP Films when playing the character Diamond in the low-budget B-Movie Crossroads to Crime alongside David Graham. Graham believes that because of his voice quality, Gerry thought he would make a good Masterspy, while Gould remembers Murcell doing "all the European voices". Murcell left the series after 24 episodes, which explains why he, and Popkiss do not appear in the last two episodes of the first series.

Sylvia Anderson, then Sylvia Thamm before her marriage to Anderson, was credited as "voice direction", and voiced Jimmy Gibson and all female characters in the series; however, she was not credited for the first series. Originally Sylvia was not to voice Jimmy, but she was given the opportunity when Gerry was not happy with the original voice of Jimmy that had already been recorded. This marked Sylvia’s first involvement in voice acting.

Cyril Shaps was brought in to voice Professor Popkiss and Masterspy for the second series. David Graham was a friend of Shaps and suggested him for the part when Murcell left. At the time Shaps was performing in the West End play The Tenth Man, which Graham and the Andersons went to see.

U.S. syndication
Supercar debuted in the U.S. on WPIX, a local station in New York, on Saturday 6 January 1962 at 6:30 pm. The station's EVP and general manager, Fred M. Thrower, reported to ITC that after four weeks the show "has solidly established itself as the number one program in its time period and the number one weekend children's show in New York among all local children shows in this market" with an average ARB rating of 15.2. Sales revenue after eight weeks was $750,000. By January 1963, Supercar had been sold into 140 U.S. and 49 foreign markets for $1.9 million in total sales, guaranteeing production of a second series of shows.

Comic book
In the U.K., comics based on the series appeared in TV Comic in the years 1961–1964, running from issue #483 (18 March 1961) until issue #667 (26 September 1964). These stories were drawn by H. Watts and Bill Mevin. Further Supercar comics were published in TV Century 21, from 23 January 1965 to 8 Jan. 1966, drawn by Bruno Marraffa.

Supercar was the first Gerry Anderson series to be adapted as a comic book in America, with the Gold Key company releasing four issues between November 1962 and August 1963.

Misc!Mayhem Productions in the USA planned to release a five-issue Supercar licensed comic book mini-series "picking up where the classic Gerry Anderson TV series left off". Only the first issue (Vol. 1. No.0) appeared in February 2003.

Soundtrack
In 1998, Fanderson issued a limited-edition album of Barry Gray's music from the series, paired with his work on Fireball XL5. It was the first soundtrack album produced by the society.

In 2013, the society released a second limited-edition disc, this one completely devoted to the series.

Reception
Noting aspects such as the lack of female regular characters, Marcus Hearn describes Supercar as being "squarely aimed at little boys of the Meccano era". He also writes that the series' over-arching "rescue theme", as well as its "fetishisation" of technology, make it comparable to APF's later science-fiction productions.

Reviewing Supercar for DVD Talk, Glenn Erickson gave the series the highest rating of "Excellent", praising its puppet sets, scale model work, special effects and "razor-sharp" cinematography. He wrote that the production values were of a kind which "simply weren't seen in 1960  children's programming, which made this peppy half-hour programme a sure bet for syndication." He also commented that the inclusion of Mitch the Monkey as an anthropomorphic character was a welcome departure from other children's shows, which typically focused on "Lassie-like genius animals".

By contrast, Matt Hinrichs rated the series two out of five, describing it as a "primitive precursor to Stingray, Thunderbirds and Captain Scarlet", and best skipped. Calling the production standards "modest", he wrote that much of the series was "repetitive, snail-paced and unimaginative", also arguing that it had "too many awkward components [...] to meld into a satisfying whole". He believed that although the changes between production blocks made the second series superior to the first, ultimately they only turned "a crude, boring time-waster into something that was merely passable".

References

Bibliography

External links

 – record of the episode "Flight of Fancy"

1960s British children's television series
1960s British science fiction television series
1961 British television series debuts
1962 British television series endings
AP Films
Aviation television series
Black-and-white British television shows
British children's action television series
British children's science fiction television series
British television shows featuring puppetry
ITV children's television shows
English-language television shows
First-run syndicated television programs in the United States
Flying cars in fiction
Marionette films
Television series by ITC Entertainment
Television series set in 1960
Television series set in 1961
Television series set in 1962
Television shows adapted into comics
Television shows set in Nevada